Sonali Khare (born 5 December 1982) is an Indian Marathi film and television actress. She was a part of the film Tere Liye as Tara. She also part of television such as Abhalmaya, Pyaar Ke Do Naam: Ek Raadha, Ek Shyaam as Kaveri and Be Dune Daha as Asawari.

Early life and career
Khare was born on 5 December 1982 in Bombay, Maharashtra. She started her career at the age of 17 in the year 2000. In 2001, she played a small role in Tere Liye. In 2004, she debuted in Marathi film Savarkhed Ek Gaon based on Mysterious events. She played the lead role in Checkmate alongside Ankush Chaudhari, Swwapnil Joshi. She has been part of Pyaar Ke Do Naam: Ek Raadha, Ek Shyaam as Kaveri. She also appeared in several Marathi films such as 7, Roshan Villa, & Jara Hatke, Hrudayantar, Smile Please, Well Done Baby, etc.

Personal life
She is married to Bijay Anand, another actor in the Marathi and Hindi film industry. Sonali lives in Mumbai with her husband and daughter, Sanaya.

Filmography

Films

Television

References

External links

21st-century Indian actresses
Indian television actresses
Actresses in Marathi cinema
Actresses in Hindi cinema
Living people
Place of birth missing (living people)
1982 births